Ian Dennis may refer to:

 Ian Dennis (artist) Internet celebrity
 Ian Dennis (football commentator) (born 1971), British football commentator
 Ian Dennis (professor), professor of English law